Behrouz Afkhami (born October 24, 1956) is an Iranian film director and screenwriter. He is known for a style that utilizes point of view camera techniques to portray stories of human drama. He was also member of the Iranian Parliament from 2000 to 2004. He was the host of the third series of the television program, Haft.

Career and life
Behrouz Afkhami has been teaching script writing, directing and editing both privately and in universities since 1989.

Filmography
 Azar, Shahdokht Parviz and Others, 2014, 114 minutes, Super 35 Millimeter
 Saint Pertersburg, 2010, 130 minutes, Super 35 Millimeter
 Black Noise, 2011, 85 minutes
 The Son of Dawn,  2006–2009, 110 minutes, Super 35 Millimeter
 The River's End, 2004, 98 minutes, Super 35 Millimeter. Gavkhouni was screened at the Toronto, Brisbane, and Cannes film festivals. It won the South Korean Movie Award and the Catholic Church Award at Brisbane.
 Hemlock, 2000, 86 minutes, Cinemascope. Shokaran broke the Iranian box office record and is one of few Iranian melodramas to be released in the US.
 The World Champion, 1998, 96 minutes, Super 35 Millimeter
 The Day of the Devil, 1995, Super 35 Millimeter
 The Day of the Angel, 1993, Cinemascope
 The Bride, 1991, 90 Minutes, Super 35 Millimeter

Television series
 Eleven Minutes, 30 Seconds, 2008, television production, 75 minutes.
 One Hundred & Twenty Five, television production, 12 episodes, 50 minutes each.
 Kouchak Jangli (Rebel in the Jungle), television production series: 10 episodes, 750 minutes total. Based on scripts from Nasser Taghvai.
 More than 10 documentaries for Iranian National Television.

Director of photography
 Under the Rain 1986, 110 minutes, 16 millimeter, Director: Seifollah Daad

Script writing
 Child of the Dawn, 2011.
 Eleven Minutes 30 Seconds, 2008.
 One Hundred and Twenty Five, 2006.
 The River's End, 2004.
 Hemlock, 2000.
 The World Champion, 1998.
 The Day of the Devil, 1995, adaptation of Fredrich Forside's book “Fourth Protocol”.
 The Day of the Angel, 1993.
 The Bride, 1991, co-writer Alireza Davoodnejad.
 Kouchak Jangli (Rebel in the Jungle).
 Manuscripts, directed by Mehrzad Minoui.
 53 Men, directed by Yousef Seyed Mahdavi.

Film editing
 Don't put Mud in the Spring, 1989.
 Quarantine, 2007.
 Gavkhouni (The River's End), 2004.
 Eleven Minutes 30 Seconds, 2008.

Television host
 Haft Third series

Published books
 Volcanic Core of Cinema (Anthology), year unknown.

Teaching
 Tehran University of Art
 Faculty of Visual Arts, University of Tehran
 Faculty of TV & Radio in cooperation with the National Broadcasting Company
 Private institutes in Iran and Canada

Awards
 South Korean Movie Award for Best Director
 Netpac Award Brisbane International Film Festival for Best Motion Picture
 Crystal Simorgh Fajr Film Festival for Best Screenplay
 Special Jury Award Fajr Film Festival for Best Director
 Honorary Diploma Fajr Film Festival for Best Director

References

External links
 
 

1956 births
Living people
Iranian film directors
Islamic Iran Participation Front politicians
Members of the 6th Islamic Consultative Assembly
Deputies of Tehran, Rey, Shemiranat and Eslamshahr
Producers who won the Best Film Crystal Simorgh
Crystal Simorgh for Best Screenplay winners